Little Compton is a coastal town in Newport County, Rhode Island, bounded on the south by the Atlantic Ocean, on the west by the Sakonnet River, on the north by the town of Tiverton, and on the east by the town of Westport, Massachusetts. The population was 3,616 at the 2020 census.

History
Little Compton was originally inhabited by the Sakonnet Indians and their settlement was called Sakonnet or Saughonet. The name has been interpreted in a variety of ways including "where the water pours forth".

The first European settlers were from Duxbury, Massachusetts in the Plymouth Colony, which granted them their charter. The ruler of the Native Americans was a female sachem named Awashonks who was friendly to the newcomers and remained so during and after King Phillip's War. With her acquiescence, the new settlers divided the land into standard-sized lots for farms. Among the 29 original proprietors was Colonel Benjamin Church, who would become well known for his role in the late 17th-century conflicts with surrounding Indian tribes, initially the Wampanoags and later, the Narragansetts. In 1675, Church built a house in Little Compton, just prior to King Philip's War. Today, a plaque marks the location on West Main Road.

 

In 1682, Sakonnet was incorporated by the Plymouth Colony and was renamed Little Compton, probably in reference to Cullompton, Devon, England. After the "Old Colony" was merged into the Massachusetts Bay Colony to the north, a local colonial representative to the General Court in Boston boasted that all the stone walls in Little Compton would stretch to the State House and back, if laid end to end. A Royal commission changed the state border in 1747, and Little Compton along with Tiverton and Bristol became part of Rhode Island. Setting them off from the area of Old Dartmouth. All probate and land records prior to 1746 are kept in Taunton and New Bedford, Massachusetts. Beginning in the late Victorian era, the town became a destination for summer visitors drawn to its beaches and farms seemingly untouched by modernity, and for its relatively cool, maritime climate.   

Sites of historic interest in Little Compton include the Wilbor House, built in 1692 by Samuel Wilbore and now the home of the Little Compton Historical Society, the Friends Meeting House and Cemetery, and the William Whalley Homestead. There are about 57 historic cemeteries in the town. 

Little Compton is home to one of only three town commons surviving in Rhode Island; the others are in Bristol and Warren.  Land for the common was designated in August 1677 and has been used ever since as both a religious and civic center, the location of churches, a school, the town hall, town library, and other government buildings and civic institutions. The Common contains a large cemetery. Benjamin Church and his family are buried in the cemetery, as is Elizabeth Pabodie, the eldest daughter of John Alden and Priscilla Mullins of Mayflower fame. The stones in the cemetery reflect a style of carving similar to that found both in Newport and Boston during the same time period. The entire common is listed in the National Register of Historic Places as an historic district. 

Another distinctive feature of the town is the c.1905 "Spite Tower" found in the hamlet of Adamsville. Built as a water tower, local lore claims that it was constructed to obscure the sightlines of a rival abutting neighbor.

Fort Church was built near Sakonnet Point during World War II and was named for Benjamin Church. The largest of the four batteries was Battery Gray with two 16-inch guns, an area that became the Sakonnet Golf Club.

Demographics

In 2021, there were 3,600 people in 1,592 households. Of the 2,444 housing units in Little Compton in 2021, only 65% were reported as occupied, leaving 855 units (35%) vacant for seasonal use only. 

The population density of Little Compton was 175 people per square mile, which classifies as rural. In 2021, 98% of residents were White, 2% were Hispanic or Latino. More than half (59%) had earned a bachelor's degree or higher, which was 1.5 times greater than the rate of Rhode Island (34%). The median age in town was 58 years, considerably older than Rhode Island as a whole (40 years). The largest plurality of people (21% of the town) was between the ages of 60–69. And the largest plurality of residents moved to town in 2015 or later (28%). Only 2% of the town's population was under 10 years of age, far below the statewide average of 10%, and zero percent of women of childbearing age (ages 15–50) gave birth in 2021.

In 2022, the median value of owner occupied units was $797,000, more than double the value in Rhode Island as a whole ($319,000). A household needed an annual income of $174,000 to afford a median priced home in Little Compton, placing the town among the three most expensive zip codes in Rhode Island, ranking third most expensive behind only Block Island (New Shoreham) and Providence (East Side). 

As of 2021, the median household income in Little Compton was $96,111, which was 1.3 times higher than Rhode Island ($74,489). The per capita income in Little Compton was $81,912, more than double that of Rhode Island ($39,603). Of Little Compton's households, 416 (or 27%) were classified as cost-burdened for having to spend more than 30% of their income on housing costs. About 4.8% of the population lived below the poverty line, which was less than half the rate of Rhode Island (12.4%). 

Rhode Island State Law 45-5356 establishes a goal that 10 percent of every city or town’s housing stock qualify as Low- and Moderate-Income Housing. In 2022, only 0.56% of Little Compton's housing stock qualified as meeting that goal, the lowest of any municipality in Rhode Island, leaving Little Compton as the most unaffordable town in Rhode Island and 235 units shy of the state target of 10 percent.

Geography
One of the largest bodies of fresh water in Little Compton is Quicksand Pond. Sakonnet Point is the town's southernmost point, offering views of the Sakonnet Lighthouse and several small rocky islands, including East Island and West Island. On a clear day, it is possible to view the inhabited islands of Cuttyhunk and Nashawena, in Buzzards Bay, as well as Newport, Rhode Island to the west.

Along with its scenic coastline, another defining feature of Little Compton's landscape is its abundant stonewalls. According to Bruce Irving, author of the book New England Icons, "There were once some 250,000 miles of stone walls in the Northeast, enough to stretch to the moon, their epicenter generally sited in a fifty-mile radius around the meeting point of Rhode Island and Massachusetts, with the Rhode Island town of Little Compton especially rich in stone walls."

Agricultural Conservancy Trust
Little Compton is unique for its real estate transfer tax, which was enabled by state statute in 1985 to preserve farmland in town and protect limited drinking water resources from overdevelopment.  Effective July 1, 2016, real estate property transfers are taxed at a 4% rate, with the first $300,000 is exempted, paid by the buyer in the transaction to the town's Agricultural Conservancy Trust. As of 2021, the Ag Trust has preserved 2,162 acres of land, more than 671 acres of that owned outright by the Ag Trust, with 133 acres of that leased to local farmers.

Education

There is one school in Little Compton, the Wilbur and McMahon School on School House Lane near the Common, originally known as the Josephine Wilbur (or Central) School; residents simply refer to it as "Wilbur School." It had 12 classrooms and housed the town's K–12 facilities. It was renamed after additions were built in the mid 1900s. Approximately 350 students attend classes in Kindergarten through 8th grade. High school students usually attend Portsmouth High School in Portsmouth, Rhode Island, about a 25 minute drive away.

Rhode Island Red
The Rhode Island Red is a native breed of poultry first bred by William Tripp in Adamsville, a hamlet that is part of Little Compton. According to The Livestock Conservancy, "The Rhode Island Red is not only America's best known breed, but is perhaps the world's best known fowl. It is the most successful dual purpose bird [raised for both eggs and meat], and remains an excellent farm chicken [or non-industrial breed]." In 1925, the Rhode Island Red Club of America donated funds for a monument to the Rhode Island Red in Adamsville, at the intersection of Main Street and Westport River Road. The two memorials reflect a dispute between poultry fanciers and farmers over who should have received credit for the breed's success.

Notable people

 Awashonks (–), female sachem (chief) of the Sakonnet tribe
 Jack Brennan (born 1937), president Richard Nixon's post-resignation chief of staff; has a summer home in Little Compton
 Sydney Richmond Burleigh (1853–1931), painter and illustrator; building and furniture designer;  born in Little Compton
 J. C. Chandor (born 1974), writer, director, and Academy Award nominee for the screenplay of Margin Call; summer resident of Little Compton
 Colonel Benjamin Church (–1718), founder of Little Compton. Known as the father of the United States Army Rangers and commander of Colonial forces during King Philip's War (1675–1676); died and is buried in Little Compton
Isaiah Davenport (1784–1827), master builder 
 Sylvester Graham, pastor, early vegetarian, namesake of the Graham Cracker
 Christopher R. Hill (born 1952), former Assistant Secretary of State for East Asian and Pacific Affairs and former United States Ambassador to Iraq; lived in Little Compton
  Carnegie Family, Pamela Mitchell, Courtney Sweeney, Dylan Evans. Great grandchildren of robber baron Andrew Carnegie. Lived in Little Compton
 Henry Demarest Lloyd (1847–1903), political activist and muckraking journalist; lived in Little Compton
 J. William Middendorf (born 1924), United States Ambassador to the Netherlands, Permanent Representative to the Organization of American States, Secretary of the Navy, composer, and artist; lives in Little Compton
 Arden Myrin (born 1973), comedian and actress (MADtv, Chelsea Lately); born in Little Compton
 Elizabeth Pabodie (1623–1717), daughter of Plymouth Colony settlers John Alden and Priscilla Mullins, recognized as the first white girl born in New England; buried in Little Compton
 Abel Head "Shanghai" Pierce (1834–1900), a Texas rancher and cattleman; known as an authority on cattle; born in Little Compton
 Jacob Frank Schulman (1927–2006), Unitarian Universalist minister, theologian, and author of several books. Summer resident with wife Alice Southworth Schulman, descendant of John Alden, Priscilla Mullins and Constant Southworth, one of the original 16th century settlers
 Charles Upham Shepard (1804–1886), mineralogist; born in Little Compton
 John Simmons (1796–1870), clothing manufacturer; founder of Simmons College; born in Little Compton
 Henry Tillinghast Sisson (1831–1910), American Civil War era colonel in the Union Army; Lieutenant Governor of Rhode Island; inventor of the three-ring binder; lived and died in Little Compton
 Paul Suttell (born 1949), current Chief Justice of the Rhode Island Supreme Court; lives in Little Compton
 Charles Edwin Wilbour (1833–1896), journalist and Egyptologist who produced the first English translation of Les Misérables; born in Little Compton
 Isaac Wilbour (1763–1837), 6th Governor of Rhode Island; US congressman; 34th Chief Justice of the Rhode Island Supreme Court; born and died in Little Compton
 Rupert von Trapp (1911–1992), eldest son of the Trapp Family Singers, whose family story inspired The Sound of Music; lived in Little Compton

Attractions and sites on National Register of Historic Places

Friends Meeting House and Cemetery (1815)
Little Compton Common Historic District, including the United Congregational Church and the Town Hall, among other buildings
Rhode Island Red Monument (1925)
Sakonnet Light Station (1884)
Stone House Inn (1854)
Wilbor House Museum (1692)
William Whalley Homestead

Gallery

See also

National Register of Historic Places listings in Newport County, Rhode Island

References

External links

 Little Compton official webpage
 Little Compton Historical Society
 Little Compton Census Data 2010
 "In Search of The Commons"

 
Towns in Newport County, Rhode Island
Narragansett Bay
Populated coastal places in Rhode Island
Providence metropolitan area
Towns in Rhode Island